The 1956 South Australian state election was held on 3 March 1956.

Retiring Members

Labor

 Hughie McAlees, MHA (Wallaroo)
 Bert Hoare, MLC (Central No.1)

Liberal and Country

 Herbert Michael, MHA (Light)
 George Jenkins, MHA (Newcastle)
 John Travers, MHA (Torrens)
 Robert Nicholls, MHA (Young)
 James Sandford, MLC (Central No.2)

House of Assembly
Sitting members are shown in bold text. Successful candidates are highlighted in the relevant colour. Where there is possible confusion, an asterisk (*) is also used.

Legislative Council
Sitting members are shown in bold text. Successful candidates are highlighted in the relevant colour and identified by an asterisk (*).

References

Candidates for South Australian state elections
1950 elections in Australia
1950s in South Australia